Gudrun Kalmbach (born 27 May 1937 in Großerlach) is a German mathematician and educator known for her contributions in the field of quantum logic and for the educational programmes she developed.

Career 
After teacher training in mathematics and chemistry, Kalmbach obtained a PhD at the University of Göttingen under the supervision of Hans Grauert on the topic of low-dimensional CW complexes in non-compact manifolds.

From 1967 to 1969, Kalmbach taught at the University of Illinois at Urbana–Champaign. After this she held positions as assistant professor at the University of Massachusetts Amherst (1970–1971) and Pennsylvania State University (1969–1975). In 1975, she qualified as professor at the University of Ulm, becoming the first female professor in geometry (at the chair of number theory and probability theory). She worked there until her retirement in 2002.

Kalmbach's research deals with manifolds, lattice theory and quantum structures. She was involved in developing the field of quantum structures in the 1990s. Her current research project is MINT-Wigris.

In addition to her research career, Kalmbach invented in 1985 the talent program in STEM subjects (called MINT in Germany). Part of this is the yearly mathematics competition at the University of Ulm. From this, pupils were selected to attend a mathematics summer school with teaching in computer science, chemistry, physics and where they were introduced to university mathematics.

She was a founder of European Women in Mathematics, and a member and chair of the Emmy Noether Verein which supports female mathematicians.

Kalmbach now lives in Bad Wörishofen.

Selected publications 

  Kalmbach H.E., G. ‘‘Archives KHE 1967-2019.‘‘ Bad Woerishofen, about 1000 volumes on science, mathematics, equal opportunity for women in mathematics
 Kalmbach, G. ‘‘Orthomodular Logic.‘‘ Z. Logik und Grundl. Math. 20 (1974), 395-406
 Kalmbach (ed.), G. ‘‘Proceedings of the Lattice Theory Conference.‘‘ Universitaet Ulm, 1975
 Kalmbach, G. ‘‘On some results in Morse Theory.‘‘ Canadian J. Math. 26 (1975), 88-105
 Kalmbach, G. ‘‘Extension of topological Homology Theory to Partially Ordered Sets.‘‘ J. reine und angew. Math. 280 (1976), 134-156

References 

1937 births
Living people
People from Rems-Murr-Kreis
People from the Free People's State of Württemberg
20th-century German mathematicians
German women mathematicians
21st-century women mathematicians
German expatriates in the United States
20th-century women mathematicians
21st-century German mathematicians
University of Göttingen alumni
Academic staff of the University of Ulm
Pennsylvania State University faculty
University of Massachusetts Amherst faculty
20th-century German women
21st-century German women